The Ford CD4 platform is a Ford global midsize/fullsize automobile platform. The transverse engine platform is designed for either front or all-wheel drive and Ford's hybrid powertrain. Ford Motor Company developed the CD4 platform, as part of the One Ford strategy, to allow them to cut months of development time, reduce costs and bring vehicles to market faster.

CD4 is split into various variants:
 CD4.1: For mid-size cars. 
 2012–2022 Ford Fusion/Mondeo (CD391)
 2012–2020 Lincoln MKZ (CD533)
 CD4.2: For CUVs and MPVs.
 2015–present Ford Edge (CD539N / CD539X / CD539C / CD389)
 2015–2018 / 2019–present Lincoln MKX/Nautilus (U540)
 2016–2023 Ford S-Max (CD539E / CD389)
 2016–2023 Ford Galaxy (CD390)
 CD4.3: Stretched version for full-size cars.
2016–2022 Ford Taurus (China) (D568C)
2016–2020 Lincoln Continental (D544)

References

 
CD4